Araji Hasanpur is a village in Pindra Tehsil of Varanasi district in the Indian state of Uttar Pradesh. Araji Hasanpur falls under Madhomakhiya gram panchayat. The village is about 34.5 kilometers North-West of Varanasi city, 308 kilometers South-East of state capital Lucknow and 784 kilometers South-East of the national capital Delhi.

Demography
Araji Hasanpur has a total population of 78 people amongst 9 families. Sex ratio of Araji Hasanpur is 1,108 and child sex ratio is 1,600. Uttar Pradesh state average for both ratios is 912 and 902 respectively .

Transportation
Araji Hasanpur can be accessed by road and does not have a railway station of its own. Closest railway station to this village is Babatpur railway station (24.5 kilometers East). Nearest operational airports are Varanasi airport (17.6 kilometers East) and Allahabad Airports (122 kilometers West).

See also

Pindra Tehsil
Pindra (Assembly constituency)

Notes
  All demographic data is based on 2011 Census of India.

References 

Villages in Varanasi district